Amantis hainanensis is a species of praying mantis native to China and Vietnam.

It is a small mantid with short, filiform antennae, large grey eyes. It is light grey with black spots. The forelegs have rows of short spines.

References

hainanensis
Mantodea of Asia
Insects of China
Insects of Vietnam
Insects described in 1937